The 2014 Offaly Senior Hurling Championship was the 116th staging of the Offaly Senior Hurling Championship since its establishment by the Offaly Cound Board in 1896. The championship began on 2 May 2014 and ended on 19 October 2014.

Kilcormac–Killoughey were the defending champions, and successfully retained the title following a 2-18 to 1-9 defeat of St Rynagh's. Drumcullen were relegated from the championship after four years in the top flight.

Teams

All but one of the twelve teams from the 2013 championship participated in the top tier of Offaly hurling in 2014.

Ballinamere, who defeated Kilcormac–Killoughey by 2-19 to 1-14 in the final of the intermediate championship in 2013, availed of their right to automatic promotion to the senior championship.

Similarly, Drumcullen defeated Lusmagh by 0-16 to 0-13 in the 2013 senior relegation play-off, and so Lusmagh were relegated to the intermediate grade for 2014.

Fixtures/results

Group 1

Group 2

Relegation play-offs

Quarter-finals

Semi-finals

Final

Championship statistics

Miscellaneous
 In the quarter-finals, Seir Kieran recorded their first championship victory over Birr in nineteen years.
 Kilcormac–Killoughey won a third successive championship.

External links
 2014 Offaly Senior Hurling Championship

References

Offaly Senior Hurling Championship
Offaly Senior Hurling Championship